Cole Lake is a lake in Carlton County, Minnesota, in the United States.

Cole Lake was named for James Cole, a pioneer who settled at the lake.

See also
List of lakes in Minnesota

References

Lakes of Minnesota
Lakes of Carlton County, Minnesota